Fasil Gebremichael Woldegebriel (born 17 October 2000) is an Ethiopian professional footballer who plays as a goalkeeper for Ethiopian Premier League club Bahir Dar Kenema and the Ethiopia national team.

Club career
Gebremichael began his senior career with Sebeta City, before transferring to Bahir Dar Kenema in 2021.

International career
Gebremichael made his international debut with the Ethiopia national team in a 0–0 friendly tie with Uganda on 29 August 2021.

References

External links
 
 

2000 births
Living people
Ethiopian footballers
Ethiopia international footballers
Association football goalkeepers
2021 Africa Cup of Nations players
Ethiopian Premier League players
Bahir Dar Kenema F.C. players
Ethiopia A' international footballers
2022 African Nations Championship players